Gijsbertus Craeyvanger (21 October 1810 in Utrecht – 17 July 1875 in Amsterdam), was a 19th-century painter from the Dutch Republic.

Biography
He was born in Utrecht, and had one brother, Reinier Craeyvanger. He was a pupil of Jan Willem Pieneman at the Royal Academy of Art, The Hague in Amsterdam, and later became a teacher at a drawing school in Utrecht. His most notable pupil was Albert Neuhuys. Though he is known for landscapes, he also painted figures in the landscapes of Carel Jacobus Behr.

Craeyvanger died in Utrecht.

External links 
Gijsbertus Craeyvanger on Artnet

References
	
	
	

1810 births
1895 deaths
19th-century Dutch painters
Dutch male painters
Dutch landscape painters
Artists from Utrecht
19th-century Dutch male artists